The Ukrainian History and Education Center, also known as UHEC, is a museum and archives at 135 Davidson Avenue in the Somerset section of Franklin, New Jersey, that focuses on the history of Ukraine and Ukrainian Americans.

Collection and exhibitions 
The Ukrainian History and Education Center hosts community events and new exhibits, in addition to a permanent collection of over 15,000 objects of folk art, fine art, religious ritual objects, and textiles. Furthermore, UHEC works to archive historical documents of Ukrainian and Ukrainian American cultural, religious, and political history. Largely through personal donations over the years, the UHEC Archives collection consists of hundreds of documents about the lives and work of Ukrainian and Ukrainian American individuals, families, and organizations. The organization provides access to the special collections and archives to researchers.

Response to the 2022 Russian invasion of Ukraine 
In response to the 2022 Russian invasion of Ukraine, UHEC archivist Michael Andrec has given talks throughout the state of NJ, addressing the historical and cultural context of the war while also correcting and examining Russian propaganda used to justify the war.

References 

Franklin Township, Somerset County, New Jersey
Museums in Somerset County, New Jersey
Ukrainian museums in the United States